The SIAI S.19 was an Italian racing flying boat built by SIAI for the 1920 Schneider Trophy race.

Design and development
The S.19 was a single-seat biplane flying boat with its engine mounted on struts above its hull and below its upper wing. The  Ansaldo San Giorgio 4E-29 engine drove a two-bladed pusher propeller. Small stabilizer floats were mounted beneath the lower wing on each side.

Operational history
The S.19s engine was not ready in time for the 1920 Schneider Trophy race, and the aircraft did not participate.

Operators

Specifications

See also

Notes

References

Aviation: SIAI racing seaplanes

S.19
1920s Italian sport aircraft
Flying boats
Schneider Trophy
Single-engined pusher aircraft
Biplanes
Aircraft first flown in 1920